In Magnum Financial Holdings (Pty) Ltd (in liquidation) v Summerly, an important case in South African insolvency law, the question to be decided was whether the trust before the court was susceptible of sequestration. This depended on whether it was a “debtor” as defined in section 2 of the Act.

The court held that, because the trust could, through its trustees, acquire property and incur liabilities, and because it was not a body corporate as contemplated by section 2, it fell within the meaning of the term “debtor” in that section.

See also 
 South African insolvency law

References 
 Magnum Financial Holdings (Pty) Ltd (in liquidation) v Summerly 1984 1 SA 160 (W).

Notes 

1984 in South African law
1984 in case law
South African insolvency case law